Olympian Anthony Adam is a 1999 Indian Malayalam-language action thriller film written and directed by Bhadran. It stars Mohanlal,Meena and Nassar with Sanika Nambiar, Arun Kumar, Seema, Jagathy Sreekumar,  in supporting roles. It is a remake of the 1990 American film Kindergarten Cop. The film was produced by Mohanlal through the company Pranavam Arts. The music was composed by Ouseppachan. The plot follows an investigation by Chakkummoottil Varghese Antony IPS (Mohanlal) about a planned terrorist attack in India.

Olympian Anthony Adam released on 15 October 1999.

Plot

Antony Varghese is a police officer and a former Olympian who has participated in the discus throw competition. He is sent to a school as a physical trainer for undercover operation on government's recommendation. His task is to get details about the notorious Roy Mamman who is behind terrorist attacks in the city by finding out Mamman's unknown child who is studying in that school.

During his investigation he meets Angel Mary, a teacher with temper issues, and attracts her enmity. Antony discovers that Angel has a troubled past with her husband turning out to be a drug addict, thus spoiling her marriage life on the first day. Later Antony and Angel Mary fall in love with each other.

He finds out who Mamman's kid is by accident. He makes the school principal call Mamman saying that his daughter is affected by rabies after a dog bite. Mamman rushes to see his kid, falling for the trap that Antony has set for him.

Cast
Mohanlal as SP  Chakkummoottil Antony Varghese IPS,  / Olympian Anthony Adam
Meena as Angel Mary
Nassar as Roy Mamman / Lawrence Luther
Jagathy Sreekumar as Vattoli Porinchu
Seema as Susan Roy
K. B. Ganesh Kumar as ASP Nasser IPS
Chali Pala as Circle Inspector Ummerkutty 
Spadikam George as IGP George Kora IPS
Poornima Anand as Lilly
Arun Kumar as Tony Issac
Valsala Menon as Chakkummoottil Therutha (Ammachi)
Sukumari as Bella Mam
Mukesh Rishi as Alvin
Rani as Ammu Issac
Kitty as DGP Krishnan Nair IPS
Major Ravi as ASP Nandakumar
Ajith Kollam as Sub Inspector Vivek

Soundtrack
The music was by Ouseppachan and the lyrics were by Gireesh Puthenchery. The lyrics for the song "Peppara Perapera" are taken from Arundhati Roy's novel The God of Small Things.

Release 
The film had an average box office run.

References

External links
 

1999 films
1990s Malayalam-language films
1999 action films
Pranavam Arts International films
Films scored by Ouseppachan
Films directed by Bhadran
Indian action films